The 2018 Kunal Patel San Francisco Open was a professional tennis tournament played on indoor hard courts. It was the second edition of the tournament and was a part of the 2018 ATP Challenger Tour. It took place in San Francisco, United States from February 5–11, 2018.

Singles main-draw entrants

Seeds

 1 Rankings are as of January 29, 2018.

Other entrants
The following players received wildcards into the singles main draw:
  Christopher Eubanks
  Christian Garín
  Florian Lakat
  Danny Thomas

The following players received entry from the qualifying draw:
  JC Aragone
  Máximo González
  Jared Hiltzik
  Karue Sell

Champions

Singles

  Jason Jung def.  Dominik Köpfer 6–4, 2–6, 7–6(7–5).

Doubles

 Marcelo Arévalo /  Roberto Maytín def.  Luke Bambridge /  Joe Salisbury 6–3, 6–7(5–7), [10–7].

External links
 Official website

2018 ATP Challenger Tour
2018 in sports in California
2018 in San Francisco